Zhetysu ( /  ) is a Kazakh airline, based at Taldykorgan Airport.

Activity 
Between January and July 2009, the airline served 8,671 passengers and performed 181 flights. The coefficient of utilization of passenger seats was 68%. In 2006 airline served 15,261 passengers. The airline operates only one daily route from Taldykorgan to Astana. The airline also operated a route from Taldykorgan to Almaty, but due to unprofitability, the management decided to close the route. As of December 11, 2013 the Taldykorgan-Almaty route was reopened due to reconstruction of a highway.

Fleet 
The airline consists the following aircraft:

References

External links

Airlines of Kazakhstan
Airlines established in 1994
1994 establishments in Kazakhstan